Félix-Michel Ngonge (born 17 August 1967) is a former professional footballer who played as a midfielder or striker.

Besides in Belgium, he has played in Turkey, England, and Scotland. Ngonge played international football for Zaire, and later the renamed Democratic Republic of Congo team.

Club career

Early career 
Ngonge started his footballing career in Belgium with Racing Jet de Bruxelles, Gent, RFC Seraing, La Louvière and Harelbeke, before moving to Turkish side Samsunspor, and then Watford in June 1998.

Watford 
During his time at Watford he became an integral part of the team scoring 11 goals in 56 games. He also played an important role in the 1998–99 season in which Watford gained promotion to the Premier League for the first time, via the play-offs. Ngonge scored six goals in his first season at Watford, scoring the all-important goal in the first leg of the Division One play-off against Birmingham City.

Loan to Huddersfield Town 
In the 1999–2000 season, despite starting the season well, scoring in the opening match of the season, Ngonge found himself out of favour at Vicarage Road and was loaned out to Huddersfield Town in March 2000.

Queens Park Rangers 
Following the relegation of Watford back to Division 1, Ngonge failed to make much of an impression and was subsequently sold to Queens Park Rangers for £50,000, where he played 15 games and scored three goals.

Kilmarnock 
Ngonge then finished his career at Scottish side Kilmarnock, where he scored three goals in his 12 games at the Rugby Park-based club.

Personal life
Ngonge's son, Cyril Ngonge, is also a professional footballer.

References

External links

1967 births
Living people
Belgian people of Democratic Republic of the Congo descent
People from Huy
Democratic Republic of the Congo footballers
Belgian footballers
Association football forwards
Democratic Republic of the Congo international footballers
1996 African Cup of Nations players
2000 African Cup of Nations players
Racing Jet Wavre players
K.A.A. Gent players
R.F.C. Seraing (1904) players
R.A.A. Louviéroise players
K.R.C. Zuid-West-Vlaanderen players
Samsunspor footballers
Watford F.C. players
Huddersfield Town A.F.C. players
Queens Park Rangers F.C. players
Kilmarnock F.C. players
Belgian Pro League players
Challenger Pro League players
Premier League players
English Football League players
Scottish Premier League players
Süper Lig players
Democratic Republic of the Congo expatriate footballers
Democratic Republic of the Congo expatriate sportspeople in England
Expatriate footballers in England
Democratic Republic of the Congo expatriate sportspeople in Scotland
Expatriate footballers in Scotland
Democratic Republic of the Congo expatriate sportspeople in Turkey
Expatriate footballers in Turkey
Footballers from Liège Province